The Freedom Party of Ontario fielded a number of candidates in the 1995 provincial election, none of whom were elected.  Information about these candidates may be found here.

Cathy Frampton (Nepean)
Frampton is the former spouse of perennial Freedom Party candidate Bill Frampton, and has described herself as a homeowner who prefers private life.  She was a founder of the Coalition for Excellence in Education, and criticized the Carleton Board of Education for approving an education policy which rejected Eurocentrism in favour of cultural diversity.  In a pamphlet circulated before the 1995 election she wrote the following:

Let us follow up on dear old Christopher Columbus. Under the CBE's new proposed policy, all non-whites must identify with the natives, while whites may identify with Columbus, but must never know why! Let us ALL identify with Columbus to celebrate and preserve the advancement of Western Civilization – the only civilization founded on the principle that all races, religions, and cultures are  distinct individuals, each to be treated equally before and under the law.

Frampton also called for the Ontario Employment Equity Act to be abolished.  She received 252 votes (0.7%), finishing sixth against Progressive Conservative candidate John Baird.

1995